Dattha is a 2006 Kannada comedy drama film directed by Chi Guru Dutt and written by Janardhana Maharshi. The film stars Darshan and Ramya whilst Keerthi Chawla, Srinath and Vinaya Prasad play other pivotal roles.

The film featured an original score and soundtrack composed by R. P. Patnaik. The film, upon release, received an average response from both critics and the audience.

Plot 
Datta and his friend Tingu are small-time crooks. They get in the wrong books of drug peddler Basha. During one of  their thefts, Datta sees Ramya and falls for her. In order to woo her, Datta returns what has been stolen in her house and also pretends to be a well-educated person and also acts as a SI. However, she finds out and breaks up with him, also insulting him in the process.

Later, Datta is persuaded by a businessman Shanti Veerappa, who requests him to act like his son Raju, so that his wife Meenakshi would recover from a bedridden sickness. However, Shanti Veerappa plots to eliminate Datta. Once his rivals finish datta who is enacting his son, he can bring back Raju and be assured of his safety.

Datta, not knowing Shanti Veerappa's ploy goes out along with Shanti Veerappa's family to his village, but is surprised that he is being constantly followed and attacked by Mallikarjuna's goons; who he feels thst they are henchmen of Basha. Ramya, who is the daughter of Shanti Veerappa's rival also tries to eliminate Datta, thinking that he is Raju, but realizes her mistake and reconcile with him. Datta manages to stop Mallikarjuna and Shanti Veerappa enmity, where the families apologize to each other and accepts Datta.

Cast 
 Darshan as Dattha
 Ramya
 Keerthi Chawla
 Komal Kumar as Tingu
 Srinath  as Shanti Veerapa
 Avinash
 Vinaya Prakash
 Chitra Shenoy
 Bullet Prakash as Gandhinagar Ghouse 
 Besant Ravi 
Rajashekhar Kotian as Baasha Bhai 
 Shanthamma
Preethi Rao 
Vatara Mallesh 
Vishwas Bharadwaj 
Dr. Nagesh kaveti 
O. A. K. Sundar 
M. N. Suresh 
Mohan Juneja 
Vaijanath Biradar

Soundtrack 
The music was composed by R. P. Patnaik.

References 

2006 films
2000s Kannada-language films
Indian action comedy-drama films
2000s action comedy-drama films